is an EP by Japanese pop band Pizzicato Five, released on September 27, 2000 by Readymade Records.

Track listing

Notes

Charts

References

External links
 

2000 EPs
Pizzicato Five EPs
Nippon Columbia albums
Japanese-language EPs